The 1881–82 Football Association Challenge Cup was the 11th staging of the FA Cup, England's oldest football tournament. Seventy-three teams entered, eleven more than last season, although five of the seventy-three never actually played a match.

First round

Replays

Second round

Replay

Third round

Replays

Fourth round

Fifth round

Replay

Semi-finals

Replay

Final

References
 FA Cup Results Archive

1881-82
1881–82 in English football
FA Cup